Lot is an unincorporated community located in Whitley County, Kentucky, United States. Originally known as Boston, it was named after its founder, James "Boss" Faulkner.

References

Unincorporated communities in Whitley County, Kentucky
Unincorporated communities in Kentucky